The Seychelles fruit bat or Seychelles flying fox (Pteropus seychellensis) is a megabat found on the granitic islands of Seychelles, and on the Comoros and Mafia Island. It is a significant component of the ecosystems for the islands, dispersing the seeds of many tree species. Although it is hunted for meat on some islands, it remains abundant. It is particularly common on Silhouette Island.

References

Seychelles fruit bat
Bats of Africa
Mammals of Seychelles
Mammals of the Comoros
Mammals of Tanzania
Seychelles fruit bat
Seychelles fruit bat